Borówno  is a village in the administrative district of Gmina Chełmno, within Chełmno County, Kuyavian-Pomeranian Voivodeship, in north-central Poland. It is located on the right bank of the Vistula river, in the Chełmno Land in the historic region of Pomerania.

History
During the German occupation (World War II), in 1939, farmers from Borówno were murdered by the German Selbstschutz in the massacre of Poles committed in nearby Płutowo as part of the Intelligenzaktion.

References

Populated places on the Vistula
Villages in Chełmno County